The Miloveanu is a right tributary of the river Iminog in Romania. It flows into the Iminog in Bălănești.

References

Rivers of Romania
Rivers of Olt County